Warawa is a Local Government Area in Kano State, Nigeria. Its Secretariat  is in the  town of Warawa on the A237 highway. It was created out of Dawakin Kudu Local Government in the early 90s.

KannyWood comedian/actor Rabilu Musa (Ibro) was from the local government.

And it has police academy wudil in the local government .

The council is led by a chairman who is the executive head of the local government.
The Warawa legislative council make laws governing Warawa local government area. It consists of 15 Councillors representing the 15 wards of the local government area. The 15 wards of Warawa local government area are:
 Yan dalla
 Yangizo
  Amarawa
  Danlasan
  Garin Dau
  Gogel
  Imawa
  J/Galadima
  Jemagu
  Jigawa
  Katarkawa
  Madari Mata
  Tamburawar Gabas
  Tangar
  Warawa
It has an area of 360 km and a population of 128,787 at the 2006 census.

The postal code of the area is 713.

References

https://tukool.com/know-nigeria/know-about-kano-state/know-about-warawa/

Local Government Areas in Kano State